A Roman Singer is an 1884 novel by F. Marion Crawford.  First serialized in The Atlantic from July 1883 to June 1884, it was published in book form in 1884.  It was among the best selling books in the United States in 1884.

The novel is set in Rome and in the village of Filettino high in the Apennines, a region Crawford knew well.  Crawford was born in Italy and spent many years there, including, most immediately before writing this novel, studying Sanskrit at the University of Rome from 1876-78.  He wrote A Roman Singer in early 1883, and moved back to Italy that same year.  The story revolves around the love of an Italian tenor for the daughter of a Prussian officer.

References

External links
Google books scan of the novel

1884 American novels
Works originally published in The Atlantic (magazine)
Novels set in Rome
Novels by Francis Marion Crawford